Serang Station, is a railway station located in Cimuncang, Serang, Serang, Banten on the Merak–Tanah Abang railway. The station is located to the northeast of the city center.

History
Serang Station was opened on 1 July 1900, together with the completion of the railway stretch between Rangkasbitung and Serang. Serang was a terminal station for several months until 20 December 1900. On that day the line extension to Anyer Kidul was finished, thereby completing the entire Banten railway.

In 2022, Lokal Merak heading to Rangkasbitung left this station and crashed into an odong-odong at Silebu about 5 metres from the station injuring several passengers and killing 9. The crossing gates has been installed at the site where the accident occurred.

Building
Given Serang's status as a provincial capital, the station has been a relatively important stop on the Banten railway. This is reflected in the more extensive facilities, such as multiple platforms and tracks. The station actually has four tracks, but the easternmost track is unusable, leaving only three tracks in use.

The front of the station building faces west. The building stands on foundations of up to 60 centimeters from the ground. The station building has two main rooms: one for the train dispatcher and station master, and another for administration and ticket sale. Between these two is the waiting area. Part of the building still retains the original Dutch architecture, such as the tall doors and windows.

Services
The following is a list of train services at the Serang Station.

Passenger Services
 KAI Commuter

References

External links
 

Serang
Railway stations in Banten
Railway stations opened in 1900